Buchaly is a village (selo) in Lviv Raion, Lviv Oblast of Western Ukraine. It belongs to Horodok urban hromada, one of the hromadas of Ukraine. 
The population of the village is just about 1, 345 people and the local government is administered by Buchalivska village council.

Geography 
Through the village passes railway from Lviv to Sambir.

History 
For the first time the village mentioned in historical documents in the early 16th century. But the date of establishment the village is considered 1604.

Until 18 July 2020, Buchaly belonged to Horodok Raion. The raion was abolished in July 2020 as part of the administrative reform of Ukraine, which reduced the number of raions of Lviv Oblast to seven. The area of Horodok Raion was merged into Lviv Raion.

Cult constructions and religion 
In the village there are two religious communities. This religious community of the Ukrainian Greek Catholic Church and Religious Community of the Ukrainian Autocephalous Orthodox Church.
There are two churches for the needs of religious communities:
 Church of the Holy Trinity (UGCC). 
 Church of St. Archangel Gabriel (UAPC).

Gallery

References

External links 
 village Buchaly
 weather.in.ua

Literature 
 Історія міст і сіл УРСР : Львівська область, Бучали. – К. : ГРУРЕ, 1968 р. Page 257 

Villages in Lviv Raion